Lorenzo Tio Jr. (April 21, 1893 – December 24, 1933) was an American clarinetist from New Orleans, Louisiana, United States, as were his father Lorenzo Tio Sr. (1867–1908) and uncle Louis "Papa" Tio (1862–1922). Their method of playing the instrument (which involved the Albert system, a double-lip embouchure and soft reeds) was seminal in the development of the jazz solo.

The three Tios helped bring classical music theory to the ragtime, blues and jazz musicians of New Orleans; Lorenzo Jr. eventually played jazz himself. Lorenzo Sr. taught Louis Nelson Delisle. Many reed players significant in early jazz studied with Lorenzo Tio Jr., including Sidney Bechet, Barney Bigard, Johnny Dodds, Omer Simeon, Louis Cottrell, Jr., Jimmie Noone and Albert Nicholas.  Tio Jr. taught Bigard what would become the main theme to the Duke Ellington tune, "Mood Indigo."

Lorenzo Tio Jr. also played oboe. He joined Manuel Perez's band in Chicago in 1916 and Armand J. Piron's from 1918 to 1928, and recorded with Piron, Bechet, Jelly Roll Morton and  Clarence Williams.

He died on December 24, 1933, at the age of 40.

References

External links
[ AllMusic]

1893 births
1933 deaths
Jazz musicians from New Orleans
American jazz clarinetists
Dixieland clarinetists
20th-century American musicians
Onward Brass Band members
The Eagle Band members